Phylloxiphia oweni is a moth of the family Sphingidae. It is found from Sierra Leone east to the Central African Republic and then south to Gabon, the Republic of the Congo and the Democratic Republic of the Congo.

The length of the forewings is about 48 mm. The ground colour of the forewing upperside is shiny wood brown. There are extremely faint transverse bands and an extremely faint oblique streak from the apex. There is also a dark hair pencil at the base of the inner margin. The ground colour of the upperside of the hindwing is blood red. There is a very narrow purplish brown border along the outer margin which becomes wider before the tornus, where it shades to buff-pink. The ground colour of the underside of the forewing is blood red for the basal half, except at inner margin which is cartridge buff. The apical half shades through light pinkish cinnamon to wood brown. There is an evenly curved oblique dark line running from the apex to vein four, presumably continued by the terminal line of the hindwing when the insect is at rest, as in other species of the genus. The underside of the hindwing is light pinkish cinnamon with a broad red streak parallel to the inner margin.

References

Phylloxiphia
Moths described in 1968
Moths of Africa
Insects of the Democratic Republic of the Congo
Fauna of the Central African Republic
Fauna of Gabon